MV Gullfoss was an Icelandic passenger and cargo ship operating between Iceland, Denmark, and Scotland from 1950 to 1972. She replaced another Gullfoss, both being named after the much-visited Gullfoss waterfall.

In 1939 Eimskip planned to replace the 1915 Gullfoss, but World War II intervened and the new ship was not launched until 8 December 1949. 

Some days after launching, Gullfoss suffered a dust explosion, which killed four shipyard workers and injured two.

On 14 May 1950, she made her maiden voyage from Copenhagen, Denmark, carrying 164 passengers, arriving in Reykjavík, Iceland, on Saturday, 20 May, to a ministerial welcome.

During the 1950s and 1960s Gullfoss ran fortnightly in summer on the Copenhagen-Edinburgh/Leith-Reykjavik route and three-weekly in winter via Hamburg, West Germany. In winter she sometimes also became a cruise ship. In 1950 and 1951, Compagnie Générale Transatlantique chartered her for service from Bordeaux, France, to Casablanca, French Morocco. In 1953 she was in the Mediterranean and in 1967 she cruised from Iceland to the Azores, Madeira, Casablanca, and Lisbon. Several cruises went to Amsterdam and London and around Iceland.

In 1963, Gullfoss was damaged by fire whilst being inspected at her builder's yard and in 1966 she collided with MV Malmöhus near Copenhagen.

By the early 1970s Gullfoss operated only during the summer, and in 1972, owing to airline competition, she was temporarily laid up. During this period she evacuated Heimaey in the Vestmannaeyjar (Westman Islands) in January 1973 when Eldfell volcano erupted. In May 1973 Gullfoss started its last regular voyage on the Reykjavik - Leith - Copenhagen route.

On 15 November 1973, Gullfoss was sold to Fouad A. Khayat & Co. (Orri Navigation Lines) of Jeddah, Saudi Arabia and renamed Mecca. After conversion in Hamburg to carry 1,100 pilgrims, she arrived in Jeddah in January 1974. All aboard were evacuated before the ship drifted onto a reef, then floated off, capsized and sank the next day.

See also 
Eimskip Timetable covers

References 

1950 ships
Ferries
Maritime incidents in 1976
Ships of Iceland
Shipwrecks in the Red Sea